Charles Henry Philyaw (born February 25, 1954) is a former American football player who played for the Oakland Raiders as a defensive end and was a member of the Raiders Super Bowl championship team of 1976. He played for Texas Southern Tigers in the NCAA.

References

1954 births
Oakland Raiders players
Texas Southern Tigers football players
Living people
Players of American football from Louisiana